The M-88–Intermediate River Bridge is a bridge located on M-88 over the Intermediate River in Bellaire, Michigan, United States.  It was listed on the National Register of Historic Places in 1999. It is a noteworthy product of Depression-era relief work.

History
In 1893, a steel truss bridge was constructed to carry Bellaire's main north–south street over the Intermediate River. By 1931, with the tourism boom in northern Michigan, the bridge needed replacement. The Michigan State Highway Department drafted plans, and in late 1931 awarded Jackson contractor L. W. Lamb a $21,419 contract for the concrete construction. The Fort Pitt Bridge Works of Massillon, Ohio provided the structural steel.  Work on the bridge began in late 1931, with many workers provided by the County Relief Committee.  The bridge opened for traffic in June 1932.  The original balusters have at some points been replaced with replicas.

Description
It has concrete balustrade railings with square balusters and posts, and an ornamental railing on one wing wall to protect pedestrians from the steep drop. A bridge plate gives the construction date of 1931.

See also

References

External links
Photos from HistoricBridges.org

Road bridges on the National Register of Historic Places in Michigan
Bridges completed in 1930
Buildings and structures in Antrim County, Michigan
National Register of Historic Places in Antrim County, Michigan
Steel bridges in the United States